The 1999 European Parliament election in Spain was held on Sunday, 13 June 1999, as part of the EU-wide election to elect the 5th European Parliament. All 64 seats allocated to Spain as per the Treaty of Amsterdam were up for election. The election was held simultaneously with regional elections in thirteen autonomous communities and local elections all throughout Spain.

Electoral system
The 64 members of the European Parliament allocated to Spain as per the Treaty of Amsterdam were elected using the D'Hondt method and a closed list proportional representation, with no electoral threshold being applied in order to be entitled to enter seat distribution. However, the use of the D'Hondt method might result in an effective threshold depending on the district magnitude. Seats were allocated to a single multi-member constituency comprising the entire national territory. Voting was on the basis of universal suffrage, which comprised all nationals and resident non-national European citizens over 18 years of age and in full enjoyment of their political rights.

Outgoing delegation

Parties and candidates
The electoral law allowed for parties and federations registered in the interior ministry, coalitions and groupings of electors to present lists of candidates. Parties and federations intending to form a coalition ahead of an election were required to inform the relevant Electoral Commission within ten days of the election call. In order to be entitled to run, parties, federations, coalitions and groupings of electors needed to secure the signature of at least 15,000 registered electors; this requirement could be lifted and replaced through the signature of at least 50 elected officials—deputies, senators, MEPs or members from the legislative assemblies of autonomous communities or from local city councils. Electors and elected officials were disallowed from signing for more than one list of candidates.

Below is a list of the main parties and electoral alliances which contested the election:

Opinion polls
The table below lists voting intention estimates in reverse chronological order, showing the most recent first and using the dates when the survey fieldwork was done, as opposed to the date of publication. Where the fieldwork dates are unknown, the date of publication is given instead. The highest percentage figure in each polling survey is displayed with its background shaded in the leading party's colour. If a tie ensues, this is applied to the figures with the highest percentages. The "Lead" column on the right shows the percentage-point difference between the parties with the highest percentages in a given poll. When available, seat projections are also displayed below the voting estimates in a smaller font.

Results

Overall

Distribution by European group

Elected legislators 
The following table lists the elected legislators:

Notes

References
Opinion poll sources

Other

External links
European elections Spain in Europe Politique.

Spain
1999
European Parliament